Ronnie McQuilter (born 24 December 1970) is a Scottish former professional footballer who played as a central defender.

Career
Born in Glasgow, McQuilter played for Bishopbriggs B.C., Bristol City, Hamilton Academical, Kilmarnock, Ayr United, Stirling Albion, St Mirren, Clydebank, Stranraer, Queen of the South, the Brisbane Strikers, Gretna, Stenhousemuir and Bellshill Athletic. McQuilter left Stirling Albion at the start of the 1997–98 on the Bosman ruling; he moved to England in the hope of signing for a "bigger club". Unable to find one, he signed on the dole instead.

References

1970 births
Scottish footballers
Bristol City F.C. players
Hamilton Academical F.C. players
Kilmarnock F.C. players
Ayr United F.C. players
Stirling Albion F.C. players
St Mirren F.C. players
Clydebank F.C. (1965) players
Stranraer F.C. players
Queen of the South F.C. players
Brisbane Strikers FC players
Gretna F.C. players
Stenhousemuir F.C. players
Bellshill Athletic F.C. players
Scottish Football League players
Association football defenders
Scottish expatriate footballers
Scottish expatriate sportspeople in Australia
Expatriate soccer players in Australia
Living people